Vices & Virtues Tour was a concert tour by American rock band Panic! at the Disco in support of their Vices & Virtues album, in 2011. It was split into three legs. The first leg was called "An Intimate Evening With Panic! at the Disco". It began on January 23, 2011 and currently had twelve shows listed. The second part was after the album's release, named the "Vices & Virtues European Tour". The third leg of the tour was called the "Vices & Virtues Asian Tour". This had at least two dates listed. There was a fourth leg planned, touring Australia as a headline act in the "Soundwave Revolution Festival". However, this festival was cancelled and instead, Panic! At The Disco headlined Counterwave Revolution in the region.

Set list
This set list is representative of the show on June 26, 2011. It is not representative of all concerts for the duration of the tour.

"Ready to Go (Get Me Out of My Mind)"
"But It's Better If You Do"
"The Ballad of Mona Lisa"
"Lying Is the Most Fun a Girl Can Have Without Taking Her Clothes Off"
"Trade Mistakes"
"Camisado"
"Hurricane"
"The Only Difference Between Martyrdom and Suicide Is Press Coverage"
"Let's Kill Tonight"
"Always"
"Nine in the Afternoon"
"That Green Gentleman (Things Have Changed)"
"The Calendar"
"New Perspective"
"Memories"
"Time to Dance"
"I Write Sins Not Tragedies"
"Carry On Wayward Son"
Encore
"Nearly Witches (Ever Since We Met…)"

Notes

Tour dates

Personnel
Brendon Urie – lead vocals, guitar, piano, keyboards, floor tom
Spencer Smith – drums, percussion, tambourine, backing vocals
Dallon Weekes – bass guitar, keyboards, synthesizer, vocals
Ian Crawford – lead guitar, backing vocals, floor tom, keyboards

References

External links

2011 concert tours
Panic! at the Disco